Furla is an Italian luxury brand that has been in the leather goods industry since 1927. The company produces handbags and accessories.

History
Furla was founded in Bologna (Emilia-Romagna) in 1927 by Aldo Furlanetto, selling ladies accessories via wholesale. In 1955, the first Furla store was opened in Bologna. Starting from the 1970s, Aldo Furlanetto was supported by his children Carlo, Paolo, and Giovanna Furlanetto. In the same decade, Furla released the first collection of bags. At the beginning of the 90s, Furla started to open stores and branches around the world. 

In 2008, Giovanna Furlanetto established Fondazione Furla in order to support emerging talents. In 2012, Furla opened its first flagship store in Bangkok, creating a new sophisticated store concept. In 2013, Furla started to manage its distribution in Hong Kong, Macau, and China, and recorded growth in Asia. In 2015, Furla opened Palazzo Furla in the heart of Milan, Italy’s fashion capital.  In 2018, Furla acquired the manufacturing plant Effeuno Srl in Tuscany; in the same year, Furla’s sales more than doubled up to 513 million euros, and the company finalized the acquisition of the retail distribution network in China.

In 2019, the company declared that it would only use only faux fur in its collections.

Distribution 
Furla operates a modern omnichannel structure, integrating the different physical and digital touchpoints. The brand's collections are present in 850 points of sale around the world, including multi-brand boutiques and department stores. In addition, Furla operates a retail network covering 50 countries with a total of 457 points of sale, including 281 direct stores, 141 franchised shops and 35 units in airports and railway stations.

In 2015, the company moved to a building in the heart of Milan, which also houses the brand's global showroom.

Furla Progetto Italia 
In the spring of 2021, Furla inaugurated Furla Progetto Italia, the new 43,000 square metre complex located in Tavarnelle Val di Pesa. The new hub also houses the "Furla Academy", a training program launched in 2018 in partnership with ITS Mita, which aims to offer young talented artisans access to academic studies and technical and practical courses.

In February 2023, Furla announced a spring and summer line "Italy by Furla". The announcement came via a marketing campaign starring  Italian DJ and producer Anfisa Letyago.

Gallery

References

External links
Official Website

Shoe companies of Italy
Companies based in Bologna
Retail companies established in 1927
Luxury brands
Clothing brands of Italy
Bags (fashion)
Fashion accessory companies
Italian companies established in 1927
Companies that filed for Chapter 11 bankruptcy in 2020